Killarney is an unincorporated community in southwestern Manitoba, Canada, at the corner of Manitoba Provincial Trunk Highways 3 & 18. The community was formerly an incorporated town before amalgamating with the surrounding Rural Municipality of Turtle Mountain to form the Municipality of Killarney-Turtle Mountain. Killarney is known for the lake situated within the community. Killarney is located in a rural area, dependent primarily on agriculture and agribusiness.

History 

The Municipality of Killarney-Turtle Mountain area is rich in history and tradition. In the late 1800s, the Boundary Commission Trail ran through the southern part of the municipality. North-West Mounted Police used the trail, as they travelled west to the Rockies in an effort to tame the prairies. Prior to this time, the area was home to many Aboriginal people, as well as hunters and trappers taking part in the fur trade. The R.M. of Turtle Mountain was incorporated in 1882. The first Council meeting was held in 1883.

The Town of Killarney was officially incorporated in 1906. An Irish land surveyor named John Sidney O'Brien, named Killarney Lake (before that, it was called Oak Lake by Indigenous peoples) after the Lakes of Killarney, in Ireland. Legend has it that as he sat on the shore of the lake, homesick for his native home, he took a bottle of "Good Irish" from his pack and pouring it into the lake christened it Killarney. The "Irish"-ness of the community is often used as a tourist attraction with things such as green fire engines, Erin and Kerry Parks, Little Irish Downs, and many other good Irish-themed attractions used to play up this theme. Killarney, Manitoba does not have any actual connection with the town of Killarney, Ireland. Most of the people who originally settled the region were from the Scottish Highlands, the English or were Mennonites or Hutterites of Central European extraction.

The local landscape of the area is common to the Westman area and much of the southern province. The land is mainly flat with gently rolling hills breaking the horizon. Numerous tree lined rivers and streams cross the landscape breaking up vast farm fields. The area is rich in agriculture with many local residents actively farming.

Demographics 

Economy 

Agriculture is a large part of Killarney-Turtle Mountain's economy. Killarney boasts a variety of sales and specialized services that help complement the strong agricultural base of the community. In addition, to agriculture, tourism also plays a role in the economy. The municipality attracts as many as 1,500 people each summer to its cottages and playgrounds. Killarney Lake makes up the majority of Killarney's tourism and is the focus of many activities.

Killarney has been voted the best retirement town in Canada by Canadian Living Magazine. The community works hard to maintain this reputation and the business community in Killarney provides most all essential goods and services to local residents, ensuring a comfortable and amenable living environment.

Government 

The Municipality of Killarney - Turtle Mountain is governed by a Mayor and six Councillors.

The mayor of the Municipality of Killarney-Turtle Mountain is Janice Smith, as of October 2022.  Previous mayor was Rick Pauls resigned in 2020.  The current Councillors are Jane Ireland, Jarod Box, Joan Kemp, Gary King, Greg Ericson, and Rick Pauls.

Provincially, the Municipality of Killarney-Turtle Mountain has been part of the provincial constituency of Spruce Woods since it was created in the 2008 electoral redistribution. Spruce Woods is represented by Progressive Conservative M.L.A. Cliff Cullen. Federally, the Municipality of Killarney-Turtle Mountain, falls under the federal riding of Brandon-Souris. Brandon-Souris is represented by Conservative M.P. Larry Maguire.

Recreation 
Killarney is home to the Killarney Shamrocks of the Tiger Hills Hockey League and the Killarney Lakers of the Border West Baseball League. The Shamrocks play out of the Killarney Shamrock Centre, which was completed in May 2008.

Notable people
Adam J. Baker, politician
John Conlin, Anglican bishop
Harold Elliott (artist), artist
Albert Earl Godfrey, WWI flying ace
Howard Hammell, politician
Samuel Hayden, politician
Allison Hossack, actress
Alfred Alexander Leitch, pilot
Peter J. McDonald, politician
Richard Gavin Reid, politician
Merv Tweed, politician
Finlay McNaughton Young, senator

References

External links 

 
 Killarney Guide Newspaper

Former towns in Manitoba
Unincorporated communities in Westman Region
Municipality of Killarney-Turtle Mountain